Itchy Brother can refer to:

A cartoon character from King Leonardo and his Short Subjects, the younger brother of the title character. This cartoon lion may have inspired the name of the cartoon mouse in Itchy and Scratchy.
A regionally successful southern rock band of the 1970s, whose name was inspired by the cartoon character. This band later became The Kentucky Headhunters.